The Deputy Chairperson of the Rajya Sabha presides over the proceedings of the Rajya Sabha in the absence of the Chairperson of the Rajya Sabha (Vice President of India). The deputy chairperson is elected internally by the Rajya Sabha.

List of Deputy Chairpersons of the Rajya Sabha

See also
Vice President of India (Chairperson of the Rajya Sabha)
Speaker of the Lok Sabha
Deputy Speaker of the Lok Sabha
Leader of the House in Rajya Sabha
Leader of the Opposition in Rajya Sabha
Leader of the House in Lok Sabha
Leader of the Opposition in Lok Sabha
Secretary General of the Rajya Sabha

References

External links
 

 
Rajya Sabha
India

Lists of political office-holders in India
 
Lists of legislative speakers in India